Arthur Morgan "Arto" Lindsay (born May 28, 1953) is an American guitarist, singer, record producer and experimental composer. He was a member of the pioneering 1970s no wave group DNA, which featured on the 1978 compilation No New York. In the 1980s, he formed the group Ambitious Lovers. He also performed with The Golden Palominos and The Lounge Lizards.

He has a distinctive soft voice and an often noisy, self-taught guitar style consisting almost entirely of unconventional extended techniques, described by Brian Olewnick as "studiedly naïve ... sounding like the bastard child of Derek Bailey".

Music 

Although Lindsay was born in the United States, he grew up in Brazil.  In the late 1970s, he helped form the no wave band DNA  with Ikue Mori and Robin Crutchfield, although Tim Wright of Pere Ubu soon replaced Crutchfield. In 1978, DNA was featured on the four-band sampler No New York (produced by Brian Eno)  In the early 1980s, Lindsay performed on early albums by The Lounge Lizards and The Golden Palominos. "He's never lost his interest in weirdness," Robert Christgau wrote, "even ran the Kitchen for a year, and in the eighties his unschooled guitar was in demand all over downtown as he radiated out from the overlapping John Lurie, Anton Fier, John Zorn, and Kip Hanrahan circles to enterprising jazz and funk guys as well as Cuban drummers..."

After the Lounge Lizards, Lindsay and keyboardist Peter Scherer formed the Ambitious Lovers, influenced by pop, samba, and bossa nova. In an interview with Bomb magazine, Linsday said, "the whole idea was Al Green and samba. That against this; this against that; not a blend, a juxtaposition, loud/soft. There's no particular point in putting these things together. The point is what comes out in the end." The band's albums included Envy, Greed, and Lust.

Producer 
Lindsay began his experience as producer in 1981 working with Italian No wave band Hi-Fi Bros. He has produced recordings by Brazilian musicians Caetano Veloso, Tom Zé, Vinicius Cantuária, Gal Costa, Carlinhos Brown, Marisa Monte, Adriana Calcanhotto, Orquestra Contemporânea de Olinda and Lucas Santtana. He also co-produced the first album of Anarchist Republic of Bzzz.

Collaborations 
Lindsay lent his talents in 2008 on Jun Miyake’s Stolen Strangers album providing vocals and guitar on the album’s opener “Alviveride” as well as on “O Fim”, “Turn Back” and “Outros Escuros”.
In 2013, Lindsay sang on "I Guess We're Floating" by Stephon Alexander and Rioux. The song was released on the album Here Comes Now in August 2014 by Connect Records.

Exhibition 
 netmage 2006 performs Ipanema Théories with Dominique Gonzalez Foerster and alone Garden of self regard

Discography 
More or less comprehensive the discography integrates all work as a leader, band projects and contributions on albums of other musicians. Lindsay's own work can simply be singled out by sorting "Leading artist". Minor contributions may only be mentioned in the notes of an earlier album of the respective artist. The No New York compilation is added due to its significance. Later compilations of older material are listed with the recording year followed by the release date in brackets. Within a year the albums are sorted alphabetically by artist not by specified dates.

References

External links
 Official site
 Discography
 "Personagem: Talking with Arto Lindsay" Interview from The Morning News
 Arto Lindsay & Toni Nogueira: "Buy One" (1:06) published on the Tellus Audio Cassette Magazine at Ubuweb
 Official Myspace page for Llik Your Idols, a documentary about the Cinema of Transgression featuring Arto Lindsay

1953 births
Living people
Musicians from Richmond, Virginia
Record producers from Virginia
20th-century American guitarists
20th-century American male musicians
American expatriates in Brazil
American experimental guitarists
American male guitarists
American male singers
No wave musicians
The Golden Palominos members
The Lounge Lizards members
Righteous Babe Records artists
ZE Records artists
Gramavision Records artists
Northern Spy Records artists